Mount Ta is a scenic site of Zhifu District, Yantai, in Shandong province, People's Republic of China. It has a temple dedicated to the boddhisatva Kuan Yin as well as a Taoist pagoda dedicated to the Three Pure Ones.

References

Ta